Mark Gravas (born 29 September 1966) is an Australian animator, director and producer. He is the creator/director of Yakkity Yak (2002/2003), an Australian/Canadian co-production. Mark co-owns Sydney based media production company Kapow Pictures with his partner Sandra Walters.

Mark Gravas directed the 2005 animated film Here Comes Peter Cottontail: The Movie, He also designed and directed the 2006 Cartoon Network production of Casper's Scare School. Gravas also co-owns the creative company Kapow Pictures, based in Sydney, Australia.

Life and career
Mark has lived in Sydney, Australia for most of his life. He left school at the end of year 10 and studied fine art, and later graphic design at Randwick Tafe. He traveled to London in his 20s and worked at various animation studios. He met his partner Sandra Walters in London. He directed a short film for Nickelodeon Ego from Mars in 1999 and also worked with Bradley Trevor Grieve BTG on Agent Green. He went on to create and direct the short film Show and Tell in 2001 which won an AACTA Award for best animated short in 2002. Mark created, designed and directed Yakkity Yak a 52 x 11 mins children's TV series for MTV Networks International in 2003. He designed and directed Here Comes Peter Cottontail: The Movie in 2005 and Casper's Scare School in 2006.
He co-created (and designed and directed) CJ the DJ with Stu Connolly, a 52 x 11 mins children's TV series shown on ABC 3 in 2009. Mark
has also designed and directed music videos including Everyone Seems to be Out to Get You selected for Annecy Animation Festival and Tickle shown at Pictoplasma Berlin 2013.

References

External links

Kapow Pictures 

Living people
Australian animators
Australian illustrators
Australian television directors
Australian film directors
Australian animated film directors
Australian voice directors
1966 births